King (1932–1958), often known as King P-234, was an outstanding early Quarter Horse stallion who influenced the breed throughout the early years of the American Quarter Horse Association (or AQHA).

Life

King was born June 25, 1932, the offspring of Zantanon and Jabalina. Originally named Buttons by his breeder, he was renamed King when he was registered with the AQHA as number 234. He was a bay stallion, bred by Manuel Benavides Volpe of Laredo, Texas, and owned at the time of registration by Jess L. Hankins of Rocksprings, Texas. The AQHA gave his sire as Zantanon by Little Joe by Traveler and his dam as Jabalina by Strait Horse by Yellow Jacket by Little Rondo (Bunton Horse). His second dam was a mare by Traveler, making him linebred to Traveler.

Career 
Volpe sold Buttons/King to Charles Alexander of Laredo as a weanling for $150. Later, Byrne James of Encinal, Texas bought King from Alexander for $325. It was James' wife that changed the horse's name from Buttons to King. James broke King and used him for roping and other ranch work, but when James joined the New York Giants organization to play baseball, King was sold to Win DuBose of Uvalde, Texas for $550. However, eventually DuBose sold King to Jess Hankins of Rocksprings, Texas on July 5, 1937, for the sum of $800.

Breeding record 
King was the sire of many famous Quarter Horses including Brown King H, Martha King, Royal King, King's Pistol, Gay Widow, Black Gold King, Power Command, Poco Bueno, Continental King, and LH Quarter Moon. Two of his sons were inducted into the AQHA Hall of Fame, those being Poco Bueno and Royal King. His daughter Taboo was the dam of Joe Cody, another member of the AQHA Hall of Fame.

Death and honors 
King died on March 24, 1958 of heart failure.

King was inducted into the AQHA Hall of Fame in 1989.

Pedigree

See also
 List of historical horses

Notes

References

 All Breed Pedigree Database Pedigree of King retrieved on June 22, 2007
 AQHA Hall of Fame accessed on September 1, 2017

Further reading

External links
 King at Quarter Horse Directory
 King at Foundation Horses
 King at Quarter Horse Legends

American Quarter Horse show horses
American Quarter Horse sires
1932 animal births
1958 animal deaths
AQHA Hall of Fame (horses)